Hanwha Aerospace Co., Ltd., formerly Hanwha Techwin Co Ltd is a subsidiary of Hanwha Group, is an aerospace industrial company headquartered in Changwon, South Korea. It was established in 1977 as Samsung Precision. The company is Korea's only gas turbine engine manufacturer, and specializes in the development, production and maintenance of aircraft engines. In 1979, it started the aircraft engine business with gas turbine engine depot maintenance business, providing various gas turbine solutions to Korea and all over the world and by 2016 the company had produced more than 8,000 pieces of equipment.

History
Samsung Precision (1977)

Established in 1977 as Samsung Precision Industry, the company produced its first missile propulsion system in its first year of operation. In 1978, it established its first factory and precision machinery R&D institute in Changwon. In 1979, it began production of gas turbine engines for aircraft and started a joint venture with Minolta, Japan to produce cameras. After the completion of its second factory in Changwon in 1980, the company began producing aircraft components in 1981. In 1982, it achieved the first localization of aircraft components. In 1983, it acquired a part of the heavy equipment factory of Korea Heavy Industries, and produced a multi-joint assembly robot in 1984, followed by the establishment of Samsung United Airlines in a joint venture with Pratt & Whitney of the United States in 1985. In 1986, the company was selected as the major supplier of the Korean Fighter Program (KFP).

Samsung Aerospace Co., Ltd. (1987)

In February 1987, the company changed its name to Samsung Aerospace Co., Ltd. and established the Aerospace R&D Institute to begin developing helicopters. In the same year, it went public on the Korea Stock Exchange. In 1988, the company began its aviation transportation business and exported Samsung cameras to the United States for the first time. In 1989, it established its first overseas subsidiary in the United States. In 1991, it acquired an automated warehouse business from Samsung Electronics, and in 1993, it established the Gyeongnam Sacheon Plant to produce Lockheed Martin F-16 Fighter Jets under license in Korea. It even participated in the development of twin-engine composite material aircraft. In 1995, it acquired Union Optical Company headquartered in Japan, and Rollei GmbH & Co. KG headquartered in Germany, and launched its camera brand 'Kenox' in the following year. However, after the foreign exchange crisis in 1997, the company spun off its automation business to SFA in 1998, and transferred its aircraft business assets and rights, including the KF-16, to the “Korea Aerospace Industries, LTD. (KAI),” by means of the integration of domestic aircraft manufacturers led by the government in 1999. In the same year, it began mass-producing the K9 SPH (Self-Propelled Howitzer).

Samsung Techwin (2000)	

Samsung Aerospace Co., Ltd., which had focused on the aircraft business, changed its name to Samsung Techwin after completely withdrawing from the aircraft manufacturing industry in March 2000. The company decided to concentrate on nurturing its semiconductor system and optical digital businesses, and envisioned itself as a digital specialist.

In 2000, it mass-produced the world’s first ultra-thin coated semiconductor components, and in 2002, it established sales subsidiaries in Germany and the U.K. In 2009, its camera business was spun off into a separate company called ‘Samsung Digital Imaging’. See the Samsung Camera section for more information.

Hanwha Techwin (2015)

In November 2014, Samsung Electronics Co., Ltd., the largest shareholder of Samsung Techwin, as well as Samsung C&T, Samsung SDI, Samsung Life Insurance, and Samsung Securities sold all shares of Samsung Techwin to Hanwha Corporation, and the company name was changed to Hanwha Techwin Co., Ltd.
 

As Hanwha Corporation acquired Samsung Techwin (currently Hanwha Aerospace) and Samsung Thales (currently Hanwha Systems) in June 2015, Hanwha Group has comprehensively expanded its defense and electronics business from its Defense Division’s precision-guided munitions to Hanwha Techwin’s aircraft engines and ground equipment platform, such as self-propelled howitzers, as well as Hanwha Thales’ avionics and radars. The following year, in 2016, it acquired Doosan DST, the defense industry division of the Doosan Group, expanding its defense business to armored vehicles, air defense systems, and missile launch systems, and was newly launched as ‘Hanwha Defense (now Hanwha Aerospace)’.

Hanwha Aerospace (2018)

In April 2017, Hanwha Techwin split its Defense Division, Energy Equipment Division, and Industrial Equipment Division into three companies, Hanwha Land Systems Co., LTD., Hanwha Power Systems Co., LTD., and Hanwha Precision Machinery Co., Ltd., respectively. 
Then, in April 2018, Hanwha Techwin split its Security Segment and established a new privately held company called Hanwha Techwin, and changed the name of its subordinate corporation, the original Hanwha Techwin, to Hanwha Aerospace Co., Ltd.

In October 2018, Hanwha Aerospace acquired and incorporated aircraft propulsion, hydraulic, and fuel systems business from the Machinery Division of Hanwha Corporation, as well as the "Aviation Business," which includes aviation components such as landing gear from the Korean Fighter eXperimental (KFX) project.

In 2019, Hanwha Land Systems (currently Hanwha Aerospace), specializing in the K9 SPH (Self-Propelled Howitzer), absorbed its 100% subsidiary Hanwha Defense (currently Hanwha Aerospace) specialized in armored vehicles and launch systems such as K21 IFV (Infantry Fighting Vehicle) and K30 BIHO (Air Defense Gun & Missile System). In addition, it changed the subordinate corporation’s name to ‘Hanwha Defense (currently Hanwha Aerospace)’, newly launching an integrated corporation.

In November 2022, Hanwha Aerospace absorbed its 100% subsidiary, Hanwha Defense, and it plans to merge and acquire the Defense Division of Hanwha Corporation as well. As a result, Hanwha Aerospace plans to strengthen its defense business portfolio from its existing aircraft engine and space business to Hanwha Defense's artillery systems, armored vehicles, air defense systems and unmanned ground systems, as well as ammunition and guided weapon systems of Hanwha Corporation’s Defense Division. On the other hand, it will sell the affiliates mainly focusing on civilian business, Hanwha Power Systems and Hanwha Precision Machinery, to Hanwha Corporation.

Segments 
Through the merger and acquisition of Hanwha Defense and the Defense Division of Hanwha Corporation, Hanwha Aerospace is expanding its business from existing aviation engines and space businesses to space, aviation, and entire areas of defense industry, including air, land and ocean.

[Space]
Hanwha Aerospace produces various key components including a total of six liquid rocket engines, fluid control valves, attitude control systems, and propulsion-testing systems installed on the Korea Space Launch Vehicle, Nuri (KSLV-2). 
In December 2022, Hanwha Aerospace was selected to lead the Korea Space Launch Vehicle Advance Project, and it plans to manufacture three additional ‘Nuris(KSLV-2)’ with Korea Aerospace Research Institute (KARI) from 2023 to 2027 and launch the vehicles four more times. Meanwhile, in 2021, Hanwha Aerospace acquired a stake in Satrec Initiative Co., Ltd., a satellite system development and export company.

[Aircraft]
Beginning with the gas turbine engine depot maintenance business in 1979, Hanwha Aerospace advanced into the aircraft engine business including a wide range of fighter aircraft engines for advanced trainers such as the F-15K and T-50, localized engines for Korean helicopter ‘Surion’, and engines for flagship naval vessels, exceeding its cumulative production over 9,000 units. It also supplies engine parts for civil aircrafts to the U.S. headquartered GE (General Electric), the U.K. headquartered R-R (Rolls-Royce), and the U.S. headquartered P&W (Pratt & Whitney). In 2019, Hanwha Aerospace launched Hanwha Aerospace USA through acquiring EDAC, an American aircraft engine parts manufacturer.

[Land Defense Systems]
Hanwha Aerospace develops and produces land defense systems such as artillery systems, armored vehicles, air defense systems, naval defense systems, and manned-unmanned teaming systems, and plans to expand its business areas to guided weapons, ammunition systems, lasers, navigation systems, etc. through the gunpowder technologies of Hanwha Defense (previously the Defense Division of Hanwha Corporation), which will be acquired in April 2023.

Hanwha Aerospace produces and supplies products as below:
•	Artillery Systems: K9 SPH Thunder (Self-Propelled Howitzer), K10 ARV (Ammunition Resupply Vehicle), K77 FDCV (Fire Direction Center Vehicle), K55A1 SPH (Self-Propelled Howitzer), K56 ARV (Ammunition Resupply Vehicle), EVO-105 SPH (Evolved Self-Propelled Howitzer), Launcher, etc.
•	Armored Vehicles: K21 IFV (Infantry Fighting Vehicle), K200A1 (Armored Personnel Carrier), 120mm SPMC (Self-Propelled Mortar Carrier), Barracuda (Armored Wheeled Vehicle), TIGON AWV (Armored Wheeled Vehicle), CBR PATROL (CBR Reconnaissance Vehicle), etc.
•	Air Defense Systems: K30 BIHO (Air Defense Gun & Missile System), 30mm AAGW (Anti-Aircraft Gun Wheeled Vehicle System), K31 Chunma (Air Defense Missile System), NOBONG 40mm Twin Naval Gun, Naval Vulcan Air Defense System, etc.
•	Naval Defense Systems: KAAV (Amphibious Assault Vehicle), KM3 (Amphibious Bridge and Ferry System), etc.
•	Manned-Unmanned Teaming Systems: EOD Robot, Unmanned Ground Combat Vehicle, ARION-SMET (Tactical Unmanned Ground Vehicle), etc.
•	Guided Weapon/Ammunition Systems: Chunmoo MRLS (Multiple Rocket Launch System), Tactical Surface-to-Surface Missile System, TAipers (Anti-Tank Guided Missile), Mortar Ammunition, Rockets, Munitions for Combat Engineers, etc.
•	Navigation Systems: Gyro Sensor, etc.

[Electric Propulsion System]
Hanwha Aerospace plans to supply ESS (Energy Storage System) and Electric Engines, which are key components of eco-friendly powertrain in the UAM (Urban Air Mobility) field, to Overair in the U.S. by 2023. In addition, in 2022, it has formed a long-term partnership with the U.K.-headquartered Vertical Aerospace to jointly develop electromechanical actuators (EMAs) for electric vertical take-off and landing (eVTOL) aircraft. In addition, ESS for ships is being developed/delivered targeting the eco-friendly ship market. Also, it develops and supplies ESS for commercial maritime vessels targeting eco-friendly ship market.

Subsidiaries

 Hanwha Vision
 Hanwha Systems

See also
 Hanwha Group

References

External links
Hanwha Aerospace Official Website

Hanwha subsidiaries
Aerospace companies of South Korea
Gas turbine manufacturers
Aircraft engine manufacturers of South Korea